Pineville Commercial Historic District is a national historic district located at Pineville, Mecklenburg County, North Carolina. The district encompasses 15 contributing buildings in the central business district of Pineville.  It was developed between about 1873 and 1960 and consists of contiguous rows of one-story and two-story, brick commercial buildings.  Notable buildings include Younts General Store (c. 1873), Pineville Loan and Savings Bank (c. 1910), Yandell Hotel and Grocery Building (1925), and McCoy Barbershop/Pineville Post Office (1955).

It was added to the National Register of Historic Places in 2011.

References

Commercial buildings on the National Register of Historic Places in North Carolina
Historic districts on the National Register of Historic Places in North Carolina
Buildings and structures in Mecklenburg County, North Carolina
National Register of Historic Places in Mecklenburg County, North Carolina